The Washington State Department of Ecology (sometimes referred to simply as "Ecology") is the state of Washington's environmental regulatory agency. Created in February 1970, it was the first environmental regulation agency in the U.S. predating the creation of the Environmental Protection Agency (EPA) by several months.

The department administers laws and regulations pertaining to the areas of water quality, water rights and water resources, shoreline management, toxics clean-up, nuclear waste, hazardous waste, and air quality. It also conducts monitoring and scientific assessments.

Duties
The agency has an operating budget of approximately $459 million, a capital budget of approximately $325 million and close to 1600 employees The department's authorizing statute is RCW 43.21A. It is responsible for administering the Shoreline Management Act (RCW 90.58), the Water Code (RCW 90.03), the state Water Pollution Control Act (RCW 90.48), the state Clean Air Act (RCW 70.94), and the Model Toxics Control Act.

Appeals of Ecology's decisions are made to the Environmental Hearings office, which includes the Pollution Control Hearings Board and the Shoreline Hearings Board, as well as several boards that address appeals of decisions by the state Department of Fish and Wildlife and the Department of Natural Resources.

Administration

Leadership
The Director of the Department of Ecology is appointed by the Governor and subject to confirmation by the State Senate. The current director is Laura Watson, who replaced Maia Bellon in 2020.

Headquarters and regional offices 
Ecology has its headquarters office in Lacey, Washington, near Olympia and abutting the campus of St. Martin's University. It has four regional offices located in Lacey (Southwest Region), Yakima (Central Region), Bellevue (Northwest Region) and Spokane (Eastern Region).

In addition, it has smaller field offices in Bellingham, Twisp, Richland, Vancouver, Washington and Wenatchee.

Programs

The Ecology Youth Corps is a summer jobs program for teenagers in Washington that is managed by the Department of Ecology. Established in 1975, the program is tasked with cleaning litter on state highways and pays hired teenagers a minimum wage.

The Department of Ecology began a vehicle inspection program in 1982, requiring vehicles registered within the state to be inspected for emissions quality. The program ended on December 31, 2019, following a 14-year phase-out approved by the state legislature in 2005 as air quality in Washington cities had improved to above federal standards. Some emissions testing facilities, including two in Seattle, were repurposed as drive-thru COVID-19 testing sites during the 2020 pandemic.

See also
PUD No. 1 of Jefferson County v. Washington Department of Ecology

References

External links 
 Department of Ecology official web site
 Environmental Hearings office

Ecology
State environmental protection agencies of the United States
Washington